Dichostates flavopictus is a species of beetle in the family Cerambycidae. It was described by Quedenfeldt in 1882. It contains the varietas Dichostates flavopictus var. bimaculatus.

References

Crossotini
Beetles described in 1882